Cocorova may refer to several places in Romania:

 Cocorova, a village in Turburea Commune, Gorj County
 Cocorova, a village in Șișești Commune, Mehedinți County
 Cocorova (river), a tributary of the Gilort in Gorj County